Ihor Dotsenko (born 29 July 1974) is a retired Ukrainian-American soccer player who spent most of his career in the lower U.S. divisions, but played two games with the Kansas City Wizards of Major League Soccer.  He is currently the Technical Director for the Richmond Kickers.

Player
Dotsenko, a native of Ukraine attended Wake Forest University where he played on the men's soccer team from 1994 to 1997. In 1998, he signed with the Richmond Kickers of the USISL.  In the fall of 1998, he signed with the Philadelphia KiXX of the National Professional Soccer League (NPSL).  He would play two indoor winter seasons with the KiXX.  In 1999, Dotsenko moved to the expansion Lehigh Valley Steam of the USL A-League.  The Steam folded at the end of the season and in 2000, Dotsenko joined the Raleigh Capital Express.  In August 2000, the Kansas City Wizards of the Major Soccer League, an affiliate of the Express, called Dotsenko up to the senior team for two games. In October, the Wizards sent Dotsenko on loan to the Houston Hotshots of the World Indoor Soccer League. At the end of 2000, he signed with the Atlanta Silverbacks who then sent him on loan to KFC Uerdingen 05 in January 2001. Dotsenko returned to the indoor game with the Harrisburg Heat of the Major Indoor Soccer League, playing only one season with them.  In 2002, Dotsenko returned to the Richmond Kickers, retiring in 2003.  On 3 April 2006, Dotsenko returned to playing with the Kickers, retiring a second time in 2007.

Coach
In 2002, Dotsenko became the assistant director of Coaching for the North Region of Richmond Kickers Youth Soccer Club (RKYSC).  In 2004, he was elevated to the position of Technical Director of the RKYSC.  On 3 April 2006, the Richmond Kickers announced that Dotsenko would serve as both a player and assistant coach with the team.  On 16 February 2007, he became the head coach of the Richmond Kickers Future which play in the fourth division Premier Development League. He held that position for only the 2007 season.

References

External links
 USL Player Profile

1974 births
Living people
Footballers from Kyiv
American soccer coaches
Atlanta Silverbacks players
Harrisburg Heat players
Houston Hotshots players
KFC Uerdingen 05 players
Lehigh Valley Steam players
Major Indoor Soccer League (2001–2008) players
Major League Soccer players
National Professional Soccer League (1984–2001) players
Philadelphia KiXX players
Raleigh Flyers players
Richmond Kickers players
Sporting Kansas City players
Ukrainian footballers
A-League (1995–2004) players
USL Second Division players
Wake Forest Demon Deacons men's soccer players
World Indoor Soccer League players
Richmond Kickers Future players
USL League Two players
Association football forwards